Doctor John is a 2019 South Korean television series starring Ji Sung, Lee Se-young, Lee Kyu-hyung, and Hwang Hee. It is based on the Japanese novel On Hand of God by Yo Kusakabe and aired on SBS from July 19 to September 7, 2019.

A recurring theme throughout the series is the debate over euthanasia.

Synopsis
Cha Yo-han (Ji Sung) is a doctor of anesthesiology. He acts  strange sometimes, but he is a genius at his work. Kang Shi-young (Lee Se-young) is a resident of anesthesiology who works with Cha Yo-han. She is smart, warm and listens carefully to her patients. People, with mysterious acute or chronic pain come to the hospital. There, Cha Yo-han and Kang Shi-young try to find the causes of their pain and treat them.

Cast

Main
 Ji Sung as  Cha Yo-han / John Cha
 Park Shi-wan as young Yo-han
A talented anesthesiologist who spent three years in prison for performing euthanasia on a dying patient whose pain he could not reduce. He is often called "Ten Seconds" as he can diagnose one's disease very quickly. He secretly suffers from CIPA until it was exposed by Chae Eun-jeong, who held hatred towards Yo-han for ending the life of her daughter's murderer with euthanasia.
 Lee Se-young as Kang Shi-young
A second year resident who was a top student at medical school. She took a break during her studies after she could not save her father in an accident. She decided to come back to the hospital after working at the prison where she met Yo-han.
 Lee Kyu-hyung as Son Seok-ki
A prosecutor who is against the practice of euthanasia. He was present during Yo-han's trial and wanted to sentence him to ten years in prison. He holds a grudge against the doctor who ended the life of Yoon Sung-gyu, a murderer who killed Seok-ki's son. He suffers from stomach cancer. It was also shown that he was an opponent to the death penalty, viewing as an act nothing less than murder, albeit a legally-sanctioned one.
 Hwang Hee as Lee Yoo-joon 
He is a fellow of the Anesthesiology Department. He first wanted to prove Yo-han wrong as the doctor corrected his misdiagnosis twice when he was an inmate, but eventually decided to learn from him instead.

Supporting

Hanse Hospital Pain Management Team
 Jung Min-ah as Kang Mi-rae
A third year resident and Shi-young's younger sister who was allergic to animal hair, including cats. She had a strained relationship with Shi-young over the health of their comatose father. 
 Kwon Hwa-woon as Heo Joon
A fourth year resident.
 Oh Hyun-joong as Kim Won-hee
A first year resident.
 Son San as Nurse Hong
She has been a nurse for 20 years.
 Lee Yoo-mi as Na Kyeong-ah
She has been a nurse for 3 years.

People at Hanse Hospital
 Kim Hye-eun as Min Tae-kyeong
Chief of the Anesthesiology Department. Shi-young and Mi-rae's mother.
 Kim Young-hoon as Han Myeong-oh
A lawyer specialized in medical affairs.
 Um Hyo-sup as Kang I-moon
Director of Hanse Hospital.
 Oh Seung-hyun as Min Joo-kyeong
Professor of the Anesthesiology Department. Shi-young and Mi-rae's aunt.
 Jung Jae-sung as Kwon Seok
Professor of the Anesthesiology Department.

Patients
 Ham Sung-min as Yoon Seong-kyu
An anal cancer patient. He was a child murderer who murdered Seok-ki's son and Eun-jeong's daughter, but before he could be punished by law, Seong-kyu was hospitalised for terminal cancer and thus Yo-han allegedly ended his life with euthanasia as Seong-kyu could not bear the torment of his illness any longer.
 Kim Do-hoon as Park Jung-bo
Inmate 5353 who suffers from Fabry disease. Also a barista.
 Ha Do-kwon as Joo Hyeong-woo
A Mixed Martial Arts Champion who suffers from Myasthenia gravis.
 Yoon Chan-young as Lee Gi-seok
A CIPA patient and high school student.
 Lee Ju-won as Choi Seung-won
A Shingles patient (first mistaken for CRPS).
 Lee Do-kyung as Yu Dok-gyu
A melioidosis patient.
 Chun Young-min as Lee Da-hae
A phantom limb patient.
 Oh Yu-na as Yu Ri-hye
A former actress who suffers from neuroblastoma.

Others
 Shin Dong-mi as Chae Eun-jeong
A nurse at an hospice center. Yo-han ended the life of her daughter's murderer and terminal cancer patient Yoon Seong-kyu, who also killed Seok-ki's son, which caused Eun-jeong to hate Yo-han for it.
 Jang Hee-soo as professor
A professor of Anesthesiology and Pain Medicine.
 Kim Gyul as Seong Dong-ho
A professor of Anesthesiology and Pain Medicine.
 Yoon Joo-sang as Lee Won-gil
Former Minister of Health and Welfare. He supports the practice of euthanasia.
 Moon Hak-jin as Kim Jung-woo
A third year resident in ophthalmology.
 Kim Seung-hoon as a prison guard

Special appearances
 Jeon No-min as Kang I-soo, hospital's chairman and Shi-young's father.
 Jung In-gi as Oh Jeong-nam, Shi-young's uncle and prison warden.
 Jung Kyung-soon as Yoo-joon's mother and owner of a restaurant.
 Lim Dong-jin as Shim Joon-cheol, a neurology professor and Yo-han's doctor.

Production
According to director Jo Soo-won, the series was in development since 2014, the year when SBS bought the rights to adapt Yo Kusakabe's On Hand of God as a TV series.

Early working titles of the series are Doctor Room and Pain Doctor Cha Yo-han.

The first script reading took place in March 2019 at SBS Ilsan Production Center in Tanhyun, South Korea.

Original soundtrack

Part 1

Part 2

Part 3

Part 4

Part 5

Part 6

Part 7

Viewership

Awards and nominations

Notes

References

External links
  
 
 

Seoul Broadcasting System television dramas
Korean-language television shows
2019 South Korean television series debuts
2019 South Korean television series endings
Television shows based on Japanese novels
South Korean medical television series
Television series by Studio Dragon